Walter Henry Bunting (18 June 1854 – 28 October 1922) was an English first-class cricketer active 1877 who played for Middlesex. He was born in Cambridge; died in Burnham-on-Sea, Somerset.

References

1854 births
1922 deaths
English cricketers
Middlesex cricketers
Cricketers from Cambridgeshire